Loimaa sub-region  is a subdivision of Southwest Finland and one of the Sub-regions of Finland since 2009. Loimaa sub-region is one of the most agricultural regions of Southwest Finland's subregions. The region has an estimate of 37 thousand inhabitants.

References

Sub-regions of Finland
Geography of Southwest Finland